Cannabis in Portugal is decriminalized, as a result of the decriminalization of all drugs in Portugal in 2001.  Medical use of cannabis was legalized in 2018.

History

Portuguese overseas colonies

Goa
Following the Portuguese seizure of Goa in 1510, the Portuguese became familiar with the cannabis customs and trade in India. Garcia da Orta, a botanist and doctor, wrote about the uses of cannabis in his 1534 work Colloquies on the Simples and Drugs and Medicinal Matters of India and of a Few Fruits. Fifteen years later Cristobal Acosta produced the work A Tract about the Drugs and Medicines of the East Indies, outlining recipes for bhang.

The 1919 work Glossário luso-asiatico noted the use of cannabis in Portugal's Indian colony of Goa:
O bangue é formado por folhas secas e hastes tentras de cânhamo (Canabis sativa, Lin.) que se fumam ou mascam e que embriaga como o ópio.
(Bangue is made of dry leaves and tender stems of hemp, which they smoke or chew, and it intoxicates like opium.)

Brazil
Cannabis was introduced to Brazil by the Portuguese colonists in the early 1800s. Their intent may have been to cultivate hemp fiber, but the enslaved Africans the Portuguese displaced from the west coast of Africa were familiar with cannabis and used it psychoactively, leading the Municipal Council of Rio de Janeiro in 1830 to prohibit bringing cannabis into the city, and punishing its use by any slave.

Decriminalization
Possession of cannabis in Portugal is decriminalized in amounts for personal use, considered to be up to 25 grams of plant material or 5 grams of hashish.  In 2001 Portugal decriminalized all illegal drugs, meaning that possession of personal amounts (a 10-day supply) is not subject to any penalties for a first-time offense.  Subsequent offenses may be subject to civil penalties or mandated treatment.

Legalisation
The political parties Left Bloc and LIVRE both support the legalisation of cannabis in Portugal.

Medical use
In July 2018, legislation was signed into law to allow for the medical use of cannabis in Portugal and its dispensation at pharmacies.  Personal cultivation for medical use remains against the law.

References

Portugal
Drug policy of Portugal